Euplotidium is a genus of ciliates. Species form symbiotic relations with bacteria in structures named Epixenosomes.

References 

Hypotrichea
Ciliate genera
Symbiosis